Gallowayella hasseana, the poplar sunburst lichen, is a species of corticolous (bark-dwelling), crustose lichen in the family Teloschistaceae. It occurs in North America.

Taxonomy

The lichen was first formally described as a new species in 1944 by Finnish lichenologist Veli Räsänen as Xanthoria hasseana. Over a half-century later, it was transferred to Xanthomendoza. Sergey Kondratyuk and Ingvar Kärnefelt proposed a transfer to genus Oxneria in 2003. In 2012, the genus Gallowayella was circumscribed, and this species transferred to it. The species is commonly known as the "poplar sunburst lichen".

Description
The lichen has a yellowish-orange thallus comprising small, overlapping  (measuring 0.3–0.9 mm wide) arranged in a loosely attached rosette. The thallus undersurface is white, and attaches to the bark  by relatively long rhizines.  There are neither isidia nor soredia on the thallus surface. Apothecia, usually numerous in the center of the thallus, have dark orange  and are 0.6–3 mm in diameter. Ascospores are ellipsoid in shape with a single septum, and have typical dimensions of 15.5–18 by 7.5–9.5 μm.

Gallowayella hasseana mostly grows on bark (especially poplar bark), although it has occasionally been recorded on rock or on wood. It prefers open or partially shaded areas.

References

Teloschistales
Lichen species
Lichens described in 1944
Lichens of North America
Taxa named by Veli Räsänen